Chiseldon is a village and civil parish in the Borough of Swindon, Wiltshire, England. It takes its name from the Old English cisel dene, or gravel valley, being noted in the Domesday Book as Chiseldene.

The village lies on the edge of the Marlborough Downs, a mile south of junction 15 of the M4 motorway, on the A346 between Swindon and Marlborough. The parish includes the hamlets of Badbury. Badbury Wick, Draycot Foliat, Hodson, and Ridgeway View; the ancient manor of Burderop is also within the parish.

History 
Settlements in the area date back to prehistoric and Roman times, but Chiseldon itself was started by the Saxons. The Domesday Book of 1086 recorded a large settlement of 70 households at Chiseldene. At one point the nearby hamlet of Draycot Foliat was larger than Chiseldon. Chiseldon lies on one of the country's oldest highways, the Icknield Way, although this section of the road is more commonly known as The Ridgeway.

In 2004, a large group of Iron Age cauldrons was discovered at a site close to the centre of the village. This unique find, the largest group of Iron Age cauldrons to be discovered in Europe, was excavated in June 2005. Now thought to comprise 17 cauldrons, they were taken to the British Museum for conservation and research.

The Midland and South Western Junction Railway line was constructed in 1881 and ran through the centre of the village until 1961, with a station that linked the village directly to Swindon Town station to the north and Marlborough to the south.

Chiseldon Army Camp was opened in 1914 and closed in 1962. During both World Wars it was heavily used as a training base for troops. A World War I soldier, Arthur Bullock, recorded overcrowding and appalling conditions, including, in the canteen, having to re-use tables and plates from a previous sitting, on which lay 'bones and chewed bits of gristle'. He also recalls being kept awake by a St Bernard dog, 'the mascot of the camp'. In World War II the camp was a major base for US Army troops. Houses which were formerly married quarters are now known as Ridgeway View.

The Chiseldon Local History Group maintains a website with information about the history of the village. They also organise a programme of lectures and have a museum in the village.

Religion
Most of the population are members of the Church of England but other denominations of Christianity are present. Holy Cross Church of England parish church has a dwindling regular attendance but many more attend on special occasions. There is a small congregation of Methodists in the village. The Methodists had a 19th-century church in the village, but sold it in 2006 due to low finances, low attendance, and regulations requiring the Methodist church to comply with the Disability Discrimination Act by building a ramp, which the church could not afford. Holy Cross parish now lets the Methodists use the church hall for services. The two groups co-operate on occasions, such as a joint service in 2007 to commemorate the abolition of slavery.

Some villagers adhere to other major religions, but they are limited to a few families. Holy Cross parish is in the Church of England Diocese of Salisbury, unlike the rest of the borough of Swindon, which is within the Diocese of Bristol, but like the rest of Wiltshire.

The parish 

The Parish of Chiseldon encompasses not only the village but also the neighbouring hamlets of Draycot Foliat and Hodson. Draycot Foliat had its own church and parish in the medieval period, but in 1571 the Bishop of Salisbury ordered the church in Draycot to be demolished, as neither parish could sustain their own rectors any longer. As Chiseldon was the larger, Draycot was incorporated into that parish, and the materials from the church in Draycot were used to repair the church in Chiseldon.

In 2017 a community governance review redrew the northern boundary of the parish to follow the M4, transferring the area to the north to the newly created Central Swindon South parish. This area included the former hamlet of Coate and the modern housing development of Badbury Park, on the southeastern edge of Swindon.

Local government 
As well as having its own elected parish council, Chiseldon also falls within the area of the Borough of Swindon unitary authority, which is responsible for all significant local government functions.

Amenities 
The village has a school, Chiseldon Primary School, which had 193 pupils in 2021. The village has a surgery, as well as two hotels one of which is Chiseldon House Hotel, an attractive historic property.

There are two pubs in the parish: the Patriot's Arms in the village, and the Plough Inn on the main road north of the village. There is also a social club.
Local shops declined in the 20th century, like in many other villages, due to more people shopping in larger towns (Swindon) rather than in the village. Current local shops include Chaplins (a small newsagent), a hairdresser, a small supermarket and a petrol garage. The small supermarket was an army barracks before it was converted into a shop.

There a 3 bus routes that operate 80, 81 & X5. All of which provide access to Swindon.

References

External links 
 Victoria County History, Wiltshire, Vol.9, 1970, Parishes: Chiseldon, pp.6-23  
 Chiseldon Parish Council
 Ridgeway Benefice

Villages in Wiltshire
Civil parishes in Wiltshire
Borough of Swindon